The 2013 Lahad Datu standoff, also known as the Lahad Datu incursion or Operation Daulat, was a military conflict in Lahad Datu District, Sabah, Malaysia, that started on 11 February 2013, lasted until 24 March 2013. The conflict began when 235 militants, some of whom were armed, arrived by boats to Lahad Datu from Simunul island, Tawi-Tawi, in the southern Philippines. The group, calling themselves the "Royal Security Forces of the Sultanate of Sulu and North Borneo", was sent by Jamalul Kiram III, one of the claimants to the throne of the Sultanate of Sulu.

Kiram III stated that their objective was to assert the unresolved territorial claim of the Philippines to eastern Sabah (the former North Borneo). Malaysian security forces surrounded the village of Tanduo in Lahad Datu, where the group had gathered. After several weeks of negotiations and deadlines for the intruders to withdraw, and prompted by the killing of Malaysian police force members, the security forces launched a major operation to flush out the militants. At the end of the standoff, around fifty-six militants were killed, together with six civilians and ten Malaysian security force personnel. The rest of the militants were either captured or escaped back to the Philippines.

Background

National territorial dispute

The Philippines retains a dormant territorial claim to eastern Sabah, formerly known as North Borneo, through the heritage of the Sultanate of Sulu. The basis of this claim is that the dominion of the sultanate has historically spanned from the Sulu Archipelago into parts of northern Borneo. In line with International Court of Justice court decision in the case concerning sovereignty of Pulau Ligitan and Pulau Sipadan in 2002, Malaysia views that Sultan of Sulu indisputably relinquished the sovereign rights of all its possession in favour of Spain on 22 July 1878, hence losing any title to its claim of Sabah.

It is acknowledged that a request for payment to the defunct-Sultanate of Sulu was revived by the Philippine government during a meeting of Maphilindo in 1963. The Philippine government at the time said they have no problem with the formation of Malaysia but said the Sultan of Sulu wanted the payment of 5,000 from the Malaysian government. The first Malaysian Prime Minister at the time, Tunku Abdul Rahman said he would go back to Kuala Lumpur and get on the request. Since then, the Malaysian embassy in the Philippines issues a cheque in the amount of 5,300 ringgit (US$1,710 or about 77,000 Philippine pesos) to the legal counsel of the heirs of the Sultan of Sulu every year in keeping with the terms. Malaysia considers the amount an annual cession payment for the disputed state, while the sultan's descendants consider it as a "rent" payment.

Sulu succession dispute

Another factor behind the standoff is the unresolved status of the Sultanate of Sulu. The Filipino group in Lahad Datu claims to represent Jamalul Kiram III as the Sultan of Sulu. However, his status as sultan is disputed by several other claimants.

Philippine claim 

The Sultanate of Sulu was granted the north-eastern part of the territory as a prize for helping the Sultan of Brunei against his enemies in 1658. However, on 22 July 1878, the Sultanate of Sulu relinquished the sovereign rights over all his possessions in favour of Spain, based on the "Bases of Peace and Capitulation" signed by the Sultan of Sulu and Spain in Jolo. The Spanish then claimed the area in northern Borneo but ending its claim soon under the Madrid Protocol of 1885 after the United Kingdom and Germany recognised its presence in the Philippine archipelago in return for the Spanish to stop interfering the British affairs in northern Borneo. Once the protocol had been ratified, the British North Borneo Chartered company proceeded with the administration of North Borneo, and in 1888, North Borneo became a British protectorate.

On 15 July 1946, the North Borneo Cession Order in Council, 1946, declared that the State of North Borneo is annexed to the British Crown, hence becoming a British colony. In September 1946, F. B. Harrison, former American Governor-General of the Philippines, urged the Philippine Government to protest this proclamation. America posited the claim on the premise that Spain had never acquired sovereignty over North Borneo, and thus did not have the right to transfer claims of sovereignty over North Borneo to the United Kingdom in the Madrid Protocol of 1885. This argument however, contradicts the treaty made between Spain and the Sultanate of Sulu in 1878, which expressly states that all of the territory of the Sultanate of Sulu is relinquished to Spain. Furthermore, the American view may be based on an erroneous interpretation[according to whom?] of that part of the 1878 and the earlier 1836 treaties, that excluded North Borneo from the Sulu transfer to Spanish sovereignty (when in fact the exclusion merely referred to Spanish protection offered to the Sultan of Sulu in case he was attacked). The United States based government also refused to intervene in the dispute, officially maintaining a neutral stance on the matter and continuing to recognise Sabah[according to whom?] as part of Malaysia.[better source needed] 
Exchange of notes constituting an agreement relating to the implementation of the Manila Accord of 31 July 1963 between Philippines and Malaysia

On 12 September 1962, during President Diosdado Macapagal's administration, the Philippine government claimed the territory of North Borneo, and the full sovereignty, title and dominion over it were "ceded" by the heirs of Sultan of Sulu, Muhammad Esmail E. Kiram I, to the Philippines. The Philippines broke off diplomatic relations with Malaysia after the federation was formed with Sabah in 1963, but probably resumed relations unofficially through the Manila Accord, in which the Philippines made it clear that its position on the inclusion of North Borneo in the Federation of Malaysia was subject to the final outcome of the Philippine claim to North Borneo. The representatives of Indonesia and the Federation of Malaya seconded that the inclusion of North Borneo into the aforementioned Federation "would not prejudice either the claim or any right thereunder". It was revealed later in 1968 that President Ferdinand Marcos was training a team of militants on Corregidor known as Operation Merdeka for infiltration into Sabah. The plan failed as a result of the Jabidah massacre.

Republic Act No. 5446 of the Philippines, which took effect on 18 September 1968, regards Sabah as a territory "over which the Republic of the Philippines has acquired dominion and sovereignty". On 16 July 2011, the Philippine Supreme Court ruled that the Philippine claim over Sabah is retained and may be pursued in the future.

The Manila Accord 

In July 1963, a tripartite meeting was held in Manila between Indonesian president Sukarno, Philippines president Diosdado Macapagal and Malayan Prime Minister Tunku Abdul Rahman. The three heads of state signed an agreement known as the Manila Accord where Indonesia and the Philippines stated that they would welcome the formation of Malaysia "provided the support of the people of the Borneo territories is ascertained by an independent and impartial authority, the Secretary-General of the United Nations or his representative," and provided further that "the inclusion of North Borneo as part of Malaysia would not prejudice either the claim or any right thereunder" by the Philippines to the territory.

Pursuant to the Accord, a United Nations mission to Borneo was thus established that same year, comprising members of the UN Secretariat from Argentina, Brazil, Ceylon, Czechoslovakia, Ghana, Pakistan, Japan and Jordan. The Mission's report, authored by UN Secretary-General U Thant found 'a sizeable majority of the people' in favour of joining Malaysia. Indonesia and the Philippines subsequently rejected the report's findings – and Indonesia continued its semi-military policy of konfrontasi towards Malaysia. The new Federation of Malaysia was proclaimed on 16 September 1963.

In a note verbale dated 7 February 1966, the government of Malaysia put itself on record "that it has never moved away from the Manila Accord of 31 July 1963 and the Joint Statement accompanying it and reiterates its assurance that it will abide by these agreements, particularly paragraph 12 of the said Manila Accord" (where Malaysia agreed that the inclusion of North Borneo in the Federation of Malaysia would not prejudice either the claim or any right of the Philippines to the territory) and "paragraph 8 of the Joint Statement" (where all parties agreed to seek a just and expeditious solution to the dispute by means of negotiation, conciliation and arbitration, judicial settlement, or other peaceful means of the parties' own choice in conformity with the Charter of the United Nations). In other words, this note verbale affirmed Malaysia's recognition of the still unresolved territorial dispute as regards North Borneo despite the findings of the Cobbold Commission or the 1963 UN Mission.

A joint communique by Malaysia and the Philippines dated 3 June 1966 also provides that both parties have agreed to abide by the Manila Accord for the peaceful settlement of the Philippine claim to North Borneo (now called "Sabah") by "[recognizing] the need of sitting together, as soon as possible, for the purpose of clarifying the claim and discussing the means of settling it to the satisfaction of both parties" in consonance with said Accord and its accompanying Joint Statement.

In 1968, the governments of Malaysia and the Philippines agreed to hold talks in Bangkok for the purpose of clarifying the territorial dispute and discussing the modes of settling it, as provided under the terms of the Manila Accord. As reflected in the official records of a plenary meeting of the United Nations General Assembly, the Malaysian delegation reportedly declared during such talks that "this exercise under the Joint Communique is over and done with" and that they "stalked out of the conference room, thus bringing the talks to an abrupt end," despite publicly announcing a few days earlier that they would discuss with their Philippine counterparts the modes of settlement for the issue.

Initiation of the standoff
Heirs to the Sultanate of Sulu felt excluded by the terms of the framework of a peace deal between the Philippine government and the Moro Islamic Liberation Front, as announced on 7 October 2012 by Philippine president Benigno Aquino III. In response, Jamalul Kiram III, claiming to be the legitimate heir to the throne of Sulu, decreed on 11 November 2012 that a civilian and military contingent should assert his territorial rights in North Borneo. He appointed his brother and Raja Muda ("heir apparent" or "crown prince"), Agbimuddin Kiram, to lead the group.

Months later on 11 February 2013, Agbimuddin Kiram and at least 101 followers arrived in the village of Tanduo, located near Tungku in Lahad Datu District, Sabah from neighbouring Simunul island, Tawi-Tawi, of southern Philippines. Around eighty people fled from 15 homes in Tanduo.

Development of standoff
Malaysian police blockaded roads leading from Lahad Datu to the remote village of Tanduo, where the armed group was encircled. Malaysian police patrol boats also patrolled nearby waters. At the same time, Filipino security agencies blocked off entry from southern Philippines. The Philippines also deployed six naval ships to the seas of Sulu and Tawi Tawi to help stabilise the situation. An additional Philippine naval ship was sent to Malaysian waters off Lahad Datu to provide humanitarian assistance.

On 26 February 2013, President Aquino appealed to Kiram III to recall his followers and to hold discussions with the government to address his family's concerns. In a press conference held at Malacañang Palace, Aquino said that the longer Kiram's III followers stay in Sabah, the more they endanger not just their own lives, but also those of the thousands of Filipinos living and working there. Addressing Kiram III, he said, "It must be clear to you that this small group of people will not succeed in addressing your grievances, and that there is no way that force can achieve your aims". Aquino also reminded him that as a Filipino citizen, he is bound by the Constitution of the Philippines and its laws. The president said that he had ordered an investigation into possible violations of laws by Kiram III, his followers and collaborators, citing the Constitution's provision on renouncing war as an instrument of national policy and Article 118 of the Revised Penal Code, which punishes those who "provoke or give occasion for a war...or expose Filipino citizens to reprisals on their persons or property". He said a dialogue to address the country's territorial dispute to eastern Sabah could be arranged after those involved in the standoff came home immediately. Aquino also declined to confirm reports of other parties being allegedly behind the standoff to sabotage the Bangsamoro peace process. The statement by President Aquino was also supported by Senator Francis Pangilinan who urged Kiram III to put an end to the standoff in Sabah. In a statement, he said:

Kiram III remained defiant, despite a warning of arrest, and said his men would not go back home "until an arrangement has been done by our officials and the president, and if that will be arranged accordingly with a written agreement signed by the parties concerned". He shared that in his last conversation with Agbimuddin over the phone, his brother told him that their followers were firm in their decision to stay in Sabah even though they have little access to food as a result of the food blockade ordered by the Malaysian government. The 74-year-old sultan said he was ready to be jailed if the Philippine government filed a case against him and the members of his clan. He said he cannot understand what his violation against the Constitution is, saying he has always respected it and that "coming home to their homeland" is not a crime. Kiram III also asked Malaysia to "sit down in a square table and to diplomatically settle the issue on the claim" stressing the need to "come up with a win-win solution". He reiterated that he and his men "will not initiate the violence... But are prepared to defend our lives and aspirations" and that the Sabah issue "can be peacefully settled without threat, but in a diplomatic way". Sitti Jacel, the daughter of Kiram III, said her father's followers were not in Lahad Datu to wage war but to reside peacefully on what they call their ancestral territory. She added that they would not leave unless they are given a "concrete solution". She also expressed disappointment at the apparent lack of support from the Philippine government, adding that Manila needs to balance diplomatic relations and the interests of its constituents.

Malaysian Deputy Inspector-General of Police Khalid Abu Bakar advised the public not to be worried, and assured that the standoff would be resolved as soon as possible. He added that the incident was being handled as a national security issue. He also declined to comment on whether there are ongoing negotiations with the group of Kiram III. On 7 March 2013, the Malaysian Foreign Ministry issued a statement that said it now considered Kiram's III forces as a group of terrorists "following their atrocities and brutalities committed in the killing of Malaysia's security personnel". It added that the label had the concurrence of Philippine Foreign Affairs Secretary Albert Del Rosario. However, this was denied by the Philippine Ambassador to Malaysia, Jose Eduardo Malaya, who said Del Rosario was "taken out of context". It was clarified that Del Rosario agreed that those responsible for the killing of Malaysian police forces committed "terroristic acts".

Military operations

1 March skirmish

According to Abraham Idjirani, Kiram's spokesperson, 10 members of their army were killed with four more injured as a result of the skirmish. There were also two casualties among the Malaysian police officers. The owner of the house where Agbimuddin Kiram and his men had stayed was also killed in the exchange of gunfire. Malaysian Home Minister Hishammuddin Hussein claimed that Kiram's men opened fire and denied that their security forces retaliated.

Initial reports from the Malaysian embassy in the Philippines had stated that there were no fatalities in the shooting. Ambassador Mohammad Zamri bin Mohammad Kassim told Philippine Foreign Affairs Secretary Albert Del Rosario that the "standoff was over" and that 10 "royal army" members had surrendered to Malaysian authorities after the assault. He added that members of Kiram's group had escaped and ran towards the sea. He said a pursuit for them ensued. Idjirani responded that none of their members were in Malaysian custody after the shooting incident. He also denied that their forces fled to the sea after their clash with the police. He said "the standoff is not over, unless there's a concrete understanding or agreement that can be reached" between the sultanate and the governments of Malaysia and the Philippines.

Idjirani claimed that Malaysian officials wanted "to cover up the truth" when they claimed that no one was hurt in the incident. He also appealed to the Malaysian government to stop the attack, saying Kiram's men were primarily armed only with bolos and knives and only a few had guns. He also claimed that snipers from the Malaysian police were targeting their group. He added that the sultanate is now looking at the possibility of elevating the matter to the Organisation of Islamic Cooperation and the United Nations Human Rights Commission. He also said that their men had moved to another location to continue their fight and urged Malaysia to hold talks.

Sabah Police Commissioner Hamza Taib meanwhile said no one from Kiram's followers surrendered to Malaysian authorities. He added that 12 men from Kiram's group were killed when they tried to break out of the security cordon imposed by Malaysian security forces. Hamza claimed that the Filipinos opened fire at the Malaysian police before they were forced to retaliate in self-defence, resulting in a gun battle. He said they found various weapons, including M16 rifles, pistols and SLR rifles and ammunition from the group. Hamza also denied reports from a foreign news agency that the gunmen had given themselves up and escaped to the sea. He said Agbimuddin's group were still in Tanduo and that the security cordon was being maintained because Malaysia wants the occupation to be resolved peacefully.

Malaysian Prime Minister Najib Razak later confirmed that two police officers, identified as Inspector Zulkifli Bin Mamat and Corporal Sabaruddin Bin Daud from 69 Commandos, were killed in the shootout. The Sabah police commissioner, in a separate statement, said that 12 of Kiram's followers died. Najib said he had now given Malaysian security forces a mandate to take "any action" against the group. Najib added that "there will be no compromise" for the sultanate's forces and that "either they surrender or face the consequences".

Presence of armed men in Kunak
On 2 March 2013, a group of 10 armed men were spotted near Kunak, a district between Lahad Datu and Semporna, according to Royal Malaysia Police Inspector-General Ismail Omar. He said that three of these men were in military fatigues similar to those being worn by the sultanate's forces. The Malaysian government began doubling the number of police and army officers, including deploying members of the Royal Malay Regiment, in areas where the sultanate's armed supporters were believed to be present.

Semporna attack
The Bukit Aman special branch superintendent and four operatives were killed in the action. At , it emerged that the police party remained trapped in the village surrounded by the attackers. The superintendent had led three dozen policemen, from the Semporna District Police Headquarters, after having been ordered to carry out an investigation at the village following a tip-off that there was a group of armed men at Kampung Sri Jaya Siminul in Semporna District. The operation in Semporna was launched at 4 pm on Saturday following intelligence reports of the existence of a cache of firearms in the village, and that an uprising by certain groups of villagers believed to be of Southern Philippines origin and residing there was in the making.

About three hours into the operation, the police officers were fired upon while heading towards a house in the village and returned fire. The superintendent was reportedly the first to be hit and killed during the ambush. Sabah police commissioner DCP Datuk Hamza Taib had said on Saturday the attack may not be related to the Kampung Tanduo standoff. During the ambush, two armed gunmen were also killed. Idjirani, the secretary-general of Sultan Kiram III, said the violence started when Malaysian policemen pretending to round up undocumented Filipinos shot Imam Maas and his four sons. Another imam was allegedly shot when Malaysian authorities learned that they were taking care of the sultan's relatives in the area, Alianapia and Amir Bahar. Subsequent police investigations and interviews with the village head, Ramlee Saraman, found that Kampung Simunul, Semporna, had been infiltrated by the Sulu intruders who mingled with the unsuspecting inhabitants, one of whom was regarded as an 'imam' despite a lack of accreditation. It was earlier reported that the intruders had planned to attack Lahad Datu police station and that both Lahad Datu and Tawau Police Special Investigation Divisions had been deployed to the scene.

During the shootout, a total of 23 police officers were pronounced missing. While captive, four policemen were tortured and had their bodies mutilated, with one beheaded, according to Malaysian authorities, who later found the bodies. The mutilated condition of these bodies led the major Malay-language newspaper Utusan Malaysia to allege the influence of drugs or black magic. Reports came out that a total of six Malaysian police officers and seven assailants were killed in Semporna. Six of the attackers were fatally shot while ambushing Malaysian police while another was beaten to death by villagers after he tried to take a hostage, says Sabah's head of police.

Operation Daulat

On 5 March 2013, Royal Malaysian Air Force fighter jets, reported as F/A-18 and Hawk fighters, bombed the Kiram followers' hide-out. Continuous explosions were being heard in Lahad Datu as the police and army as well as commando forces moved in against the gunmen who were reportedly returning fire. In a Kuala Lumpur rally, Prime Minister Najib said, "We started with air strike by jet fighters of Royal Malaysian Air Forces, followed by mortar strike; and as I'm speaking, the army and police forces, along with other members (of the security forces) following behind, are taking action to arrest and destroy the group which has breached the nation's sovereignty".

According to IGP Ismail Omar and other police sources, the army and police began mopping-up operations codenamed "Ops Sulu" now "Ops Daulat" (Operation Sovereignty). It was believed that rebel leader Agbimuddin Kiram and several of his followers managed to escape the security cordon around Kampung Tanduo. The search for these men was carried out by the joint Malaysian police and army taskforce in the surrounding farmland and FELDA plantations. The Malaysian troops recovered 13 bodies of suspected Kiram followers in Felda Sahabat. Malaysian Defence Minister Zahid Hamidi was unsure on whether the deaths were due to the assault on Semporna or from Lahad Datu.

On 9 March 2013, Malaysian Home Minister Hishammuddin Hussein said that "Ops Daulat", which aimed to flush out the Sulu gunmen, would end only when no intruders were left in Sabah, because the gunmen had not laid down their arms unconditionally. The Malaysian security forces maintained tight security cordons around the operation area and those with no documents such as MyKad were detained for further investigation.

Tanduo village was declared secured by Malaysian security forces on 11 March after a week of bombardments and firefights, with the bodies of 22 Sulu gunmen recovered by security forces from the village as the fighting ended. Meanwhile, the security forces engaged in the final stages of sweeping a neighbouring village in which a firefight left a Malaysian army soldier dead. Private Ahmad Hurairah Ismail was killed along with three Sulu gunmen. Another soldier, Private Ahmad Farhan Ruslan was also killed in a road accident near Bandar Cendera-Wasih in the Felda Sahabat area en route from the town of Lahad Datu. The soldier was believed to be part of an army logistics convoy.

The clash ended on 24 March while Operation Daulat was replaced by the Eastern Sabah Security Command (ESSCOM) on 29 June. Sabah Chief Minister, Datuk Seri Musa Aman said ESSCOM was now responsible to enforce security arrangements and undertake operations in the Ops Daulat area. The zone would cover all operations from northern Kudat to south-eastern Tawau to ensure Sabah's eastern sea borders were safe from any threats.

Related incidents

Defacement of Malaysian and Philippine websites
On 3 March 2013, the website of Globe Telecom was defaced by hackers claiming to be from the "MALAYSIA Cyb3r 4rmy". The group left the message, "Do not invade our country or you will suffer the consequences". Global Telecom confirmed its own website had been hacked but assured the public that no sensitive information was stolen. The website was restored at around noon the same day.

In apparent retaliation, hackers identifying themselves as from Anonymous Philippines, attacked several Malaysian websites. They warned Malaysia to "Stop attacking our cyber space! Or else we will attack your cyber world!" The website of Stamford College in Malaysia was also hacked with its front page replaced by a note that said: "The time has come to reclaim what is truly ours. Sabah is owned by the Philippines, you illegally  claiming it".

Google search results alteration
On 4 March 2013, a Google search for the word "Sabah" reflected a cached version of the territory's Wikipedia article. It said the Malaysian control of the state is "illegitimate" and that "in fact, [Sabah] is part of the Sultanate of Sulu". A spokesman for Google Malaysia said they have already been informed of the issue.

Protests at a Malaysian embassy
Some 20 Filipinos organised a protest in front of the Malaysian embassy in Makati on 5 March 2013. They called for an end to the violence in Sabah, while some expressed support for the cause of Kiram. At least 50 policemen and a fire truck were deployed in the area. The Malaysian embassy later suspended its operations as a result of the protest.

Allegations of political motives behind the conflict
Malaysian Prime Minister, Najib Razak, sought to investigate the opposition leader, Anwar Ibrahim, if he was involved in the incident to destabilise the state, which is known to be the ruling party's stronghold for the upcoming 13th general election. This began after Filipino media reported that Mr. Anwar may be involved with the incursion and the evidence of an image showing the opposition leader with Nur Misuari of MNLF began circulating on the internet. Concurrently, Anwar has embarked legal proceedings against government-owned newspaper Utusan Malaysia and television station TV3 for trying to link him to the incursions. Meanwhile, Malaysian People's Justice Party (PKR) vice-president Tian Chua claimed that the ruling United Malays National Organisation (UMNO) had deliberately orchestrated the crisis as a conspiracy to divert and frighten the people of Sabah in favour of the ruling coalition. The allegations made by Tian Chua was met with an outcry by the Malaysian public; there are various calls from the public and many key political personalities such as Ambiga Sreenevasan and Saifuddin Abdullah for both political parties to forge an unprecedented bi-partisan ties to settle the issue.

On the eve of its 2013 general election, Filipino senatorial candidates from the opposition blamed president Benigno Aquino III for sending unclear messages to the Kiram family. They also said that President Aquino III is in danger of facing an impeachment for "betrayal of public trust". Meanwhile, President Aquino himself blamed unnamed members of the previous Gloria Macapagal Arroyo government as conspirators to the current conflict; while Aquino did not name names due to lack of evidence on the alleged conspiracy, Kiram's daughter Princess Jacel challenged Aquino to prove such allegations. Former National Security Adviser Norberto Gonzales denied that he is the one being alluded by Aquino. Jamalul Kiram III unsuccessfully ran for senator under Arroyo's TEAM Unity during the 2007 Senate Elections.

Utilisation of commercial aircraft by the Malaysian Army
On 5 March 2013, flights of AirAsia were rearranged in transporting Malaysian troops to Sabah. An online debate ensued on whether the move highlighted such patriotism of a Malaysian-based airline or the lack of resources of the military. Some Malaysians wondered why the government requested help from a commercial airline, instead of mobilising its own fleet of C-130 Hercules transport planes. Others lauded AirAsia for its efforts in assisting the armed forces. This came despite the explanations provided by the Defence Ministry that the use of AirAsia jetliners is one that of expediency instead of incompetency on the part of the Armed Forces. The Malaysian defence minister, Zahid Hamidi, pointed out that each of the RMAF C-130 Hercules transport aircraft are only capable of carrying up to 90 soldiers each, while airliners of AirAsia are capable of transporting up to 200 soldiers each. The Malaysian Defence Ministry, reiterated by various netizens, also pointed out the fact that chartering civilian jetliners are also a common practice in other countries, including those of NATO.

Assembly at the Philippine embassy
On 8 March 2013, Malaysians held an assembly outside the Philippine embassy in Kuala Lumpur. The event, called Ops Bunga (Operation Flower), encouraged participants to place flowers at the embassy's doorstep as a show of the Malaysian public's solidarity towards Filipinos in Malaysia. Organisers also urged people to offer prayers to the Malaysian security officers who died in the conflict. Participants used the Twitter hashtag #OpsBunga during the event.

Allegations of police brutality
On 10 March 2013, reports arose of police brutality committed by Malaysian police officials as part of a crackdown on suspected Kiram III supporters, causing a mass migration of Filipinos from Sabah to Sulu. One refugee stated that Malaysian police had shot and killed a large number of Filipino civilians irrespective of their MyKad status and detained many others. Also, it was stated that those detained were not given proper treatment The DFA has yet to receive a formal statement from the Malaysian government. A Royal Malaysian Police official has denied the allegations.

MNLF reactions to police brutality
An exclusive report by News5 showed that some Moro National Liberation Front (MNLF) members were undergoing training in Jolo, Sulu for a rescue mission for abused Filipinos in Sabah. Former MNLF leader Nur Misuari has admitted that these MNLF members were not members or allied with the Royal Security Force of the Sulu sultanate. However, the Sulu Province governor, Abdusakur Tan has denied any reports that says MNLF fighters under Nur Misuari were heading to Sabah, he also denied that 1,000 MNLF fighters were able to sneak into the state. Also, according to MNLF chairman, Muslimin Sema, they respect the decision of Sabah joined Malaysia in 1963. He also said he had visited Sabah in 1973 and witnessed the joy that was enjoyed by the people of the state, adding that he also has many relatives in the state.

Aftermath

Arrests and prosecutions
Since Operation Daulat was launched, 443 individuals were held for various offences while 121 were held under the Security Offences (Special Measures) Act 2012 (SOSMA), one of the successors to the Internal Security Act. The total number arrested under SOSMA later decreased to 104, with most of them being Filipinos who were suspected of having links to Jamalul Kiram III. These included several family members of Kiram III who had entered the state of Sabah using assumed identities. 149 Sulu gunmen were also arrested with eight being charged under Section 121 of the Penal Code for waging war against the King, a charge which carries the death penalty in Malaysia.

On 6 August 2013, the Kota Kinabalu High Court convicted Corporal Hassan Ali Basari, a Malaysian Special Branch officer for intentionally withholding information about the intrusion of Sulu gunmen at Lahad Datu between January and March 2013. The Malaysian Special Branch is the country's main internal security and domestic intelligence agency. The prosecution successfully argued that Hassan's intention not to inform his superiors resulted in casualties and fatalities on the Malaysian side. Hassan was sentenced to seven years of imprisonment, the maximum jail term under Section 130M of the Penal Code, read with the Security Offences (Special Measures) Act.

Burials of Sulu militants in Sabah
In 2013 during the ensuing conflict, the Malaysian authorities has announced that those killed militants will be buried in the state if their bodies are not claimed by their relatives in the Philippines based on humanitarian grounds of Geneva Conventions.

Death of the self-proclaimed Sulu Sultanate leader
On 20 October 2013, the group main leader, Jamalul Kiram III died of multiple organ failure in Simunul, Tawi-Tawi, Philippines. His family stated that they will continue their main objective to take over Sabah. The Royal Malaysia Police in Sabah responded by stating that they "would continue to be alert for any intrusion".

On 13 January 2015, Agbimuddin Kiram - who led the group to invade Sabah under the instruction of the late Jamalul Kiram III - died of cardiac arrest in Tawi-Tawi where he had been in hiding since fleeing from Malaysian security forces. Agbimuddin's whereabouts had been unknown until his death was announced.

Trial

On 6 January 2014, 30 individuals (27 Filipinos and three Malaysians) were brought to trial where they were charged with waging war against the King, harbouring terrorists, being members of a terrorist group, and the recruiting of terrorists. All proceedings began at the Kota Kinabalu Central Prison in Kepayan where the charges were read out in English, Malay and Suluk language. Among those being prosecuted were Jamalul Kiram III's nephew, Datu Amir Bahar Hushin Kiram, who abandoned his men in Tanduo but was caught by Malaysian security forces hiding in the swamps around Semporna.

On 5 February 2016, 19 of the 30 peoples were ordered to enter their defence in the High Court of Kota Kinabalu. Justice Stephen Chung made the ruling after finding that the prosecution had succeeded in establishing a prima facie case against 19 of the accused: 16 Filipinos (including a woman) and three local men. Nine of the 16 Filipinos: Atik Hussin Abu Bakar, Basad H. Manuel, Ismail Yasin, Virgilio Nemar Patulada @ Mohammad Alam Patulada, Salib Akhmad Emali, Al Wazir Osman @ Abdul, Tani Lahaddahi, Julham Rashid and Datu Amir Bahar Hushin Kiram were alleged to have waged war against the King, an offence which carries the death penalty.

Six Filipinos, Lin Mad Salleh, Holland Kalbi, Habil Suhaili, Timhar Hadir, Aiman Radie and a Malaysian man, Abdul Hadi Mawan were accused of being members of a terrorist group,  which is punishable with 20 years to life imprisonment and a fine, or both, if found guilty. The sole Filipina Norhaida Ibnahi was also ordered to enter her defence for allegedly willfully harbouring individuals she knew to be members of a terrorist group. A local man, Mohamad Ali Ahmad, and a Filipino Basil Samiul were acquitted of waging war and being members of a terrorists group, but were later charged with soliciting or giving support to a terrorist group,  to which they pleaded not guilt. The new charge was made after Justice Chung found the prosecution had shown evidence that they had solicited or given support to a terrorist group, an offence punishable with life imprisonment or a fine. Another Malaysian named Pabblo Alie was charged with soliciting support for a terrorist group, an offence punishable with up to 30 years imprisonment and a fine if found guilty.

On 23 February 2016, six of the Filipinos pleaded guilty to being members of the terrorist group involved in the intrusion. They were Atik Hussin Abu Bakar, Lin Mad Salleh, Holland Kalbi, Basad H. Manuel, Ismail Yasin and Virgilio Nemar Patulada @ Mohammad Alam Patulada. Another three, Aiman Radie and Malaysians Pablo Alie and Mohamad Ali Ahmad, all Filipinos, also pleaded guilt  On 23 April, one of the Filipino accused, Habil Suhaili died from an asthma attack in the Queen Elizabeth Hospital. It was reported that the accused had been ill throughout the trial.

On 25 July 2016, the court found that nine Filipino militants who led the intrusion may face the death penalty. All nine Filipinos identified as Atik Hussin Abu Bakar, Basad H. Manuel, Ismail Yasin, Virgilio Nemar Patulada @ Mohammad Alam Patulada, Salib Akhmad Emali, Al Wazir Osman, Tani Lahaddahi, Julham Rashid and Datu Amir Bahar Hushin Kiram. All of them were however spared by the court and were given life sentence instead as the court found no evidence that all of the accused were directly involved in the skirmishes that occurred during the intrusion, nor was there proof that they had killed any member of the security force in cold blood or injured anybody. Other found guilty were local Abdul Hadi Mawan, Filipino Timhar Habil, Habil Suhaili (deceased during trial) and a sole Filipina, Norhaida Ibnahi bringing the total to 13.

On 8 June 2017, following the appeal by prosecutors to replace nine of the convicted life imprisonment sentence for waging war against the King, the Malaysian Court of Appeal made a decision to sentence the nine to death for their involvement in the incursion. The court's judge said the men had meticulously executed the planning of the incursion, stating that:

The following year, the Federal Court of Malaysia upheld the conviction and sentencing of the nine.

Repercussions

Thousands of Filipinos who had illegally resided in Malaysia, some for decades, were deported following the conflict and ensuing security-related crackdown. Some of these were forced to leave behind family members. From January to November 2013, a total of nine thousand Filipinos were repatriated from Sabah, a number that had increased to over twenty-six thousand in 2014. Many overseas Filipinos who remained subsequently faced discrimination. They also became a possible target for retaliation, especially from the local Bornean tribes, because the Malaysian police officers were mainly indigenous Borneans.

Further arrests and the killing of more Sulu militants
On 22 April 2014, a 57-year-old man in Lahad Datu who claimed to have been given the power to manage the Suluk people in Sabah was arrested for raising the Sulu Sultanate flag on his home. Later on 25 June, six suspected Sulu terrorists including a policeman was arrested in Kunak with membership cards, appointment letters by the Sulu sultanate, several documents linked to the sultanate and weapons was seized from them. It was later revealed that one of the suspects who is a police corporal, has family ties in the southern Philippines. These suspects had allegedly drawn up plans to reform an "army" of terrorists, with plans to mount another incursion and may have linked to the recent kidnappings in eastern Sabah. While on 22 July, three people — a Bajau, a Suluk, and one Filipino illegal immigrant — were held for joining a bid to claim Sabah for the self-proclaimed Sulu sultanate, the three are believed to have been recruiting new members to join their cause.

On 30 October 2014, two men identified as the members of the Sulu militants were shot dead by police in Penampang. Both suspects had committed robberies to raise funds for their activities and tried to recruit new members to join their fight.

Naturalised locals involvement

On 6 May 2015, Minister in the Prime Minister's Department Shahidan Kassim said some locals together with the Filipino illegal immigrants had provided information to intruders during the invasion of Lahad Datu and other abduction incidents. In his quotation, he said:

Economical impacts
The attack by Kiram's III in 2013 have since affected trade relations especially to the Philippines side of Tawi-Tawi where most of their goods source came from Sabah. Therefore in 2015, there was a proposed ban by the Malaysian police over the activities. This was heavily opposed by the Philippine counterparts as it would affect their regions. The ban came into effect in 2016 with a majority support from Sabahan residents, although it was then removed a year later in 2017 following the increase of security enforcements from the Philippines side. Despite the return of barter trade activity, the state of Sabah has maintained they will always be cautious on their trade with the Philippines due to security issues since the incursion in 2013.

Malaysian politician meeting with the daughter of the late Kiram III
On 9 November 2015, the allegation of political motives towards one of the Malaysian opposition parties behind the incursion was strengthened when the daughter of de facto leader of the Malaysian People's Justice Party (PKR) Nurul Izzah Anwar was seen taking selfie with Jacel Kiram by holding a poster "#Release Anwar immediately" as seen from Jacel Facebook account. Countering the allegation from the public that she was collaborating with Jacel Kiram to give Sabah to the Kiram families if managed to release her father and overtake the Malaysian government, Izzah stressed that she together with Tian Chua was invited by Philippine counterparts as part of the PKR delegation to meet with various stakeholders from the Philippines, adding that they also meet other Filipino politicians such as former Governor and Congressman of Batangas Hermilando Mandanas and Congress lady Regina Reyes among others aside Jacel. She also stressed her support for Malaysian government initiatives in peace negotiations in southern Philippines, as well defending the sovereignty of Sabah as part of the Malaysian federation and said that any suggestions otherwise are mere wild, unfounded and malicious allegations. Her intention was however still been questioned from various Sabahan politician and residents with one Sabahan politician said:

The Malaysian government considered referring Izzah to the Parliament to investigate if there was any "hidden agenda" to undermine national sovereignty in the form of deal between them. She was then banned from entering the states of Sabah and neighbouring Sarawak on the grounds of failing to show her sensitiveness on the issues that had claimed the lives of residents in the states involved.

On 22 November 2015, Izzah filed a lawsuit against Malaysian Inspector Police Chief Khalid Abu Bakar and Rural and Regional Development Minister Ismail Sabri Yaakob for defaming her through accusing her of collaborating with Jacel. On 18 April 2018, Izzah won the case and both were ordered to pay Izzah a total of RM1 million for all the damages made towards her reputation.

Sulu militants arms discovery
On 4 January 2016, a team of 15-General Operations Force (GOF) members led by two officers discovered a cache of weapons comprising two M14 rifles, one Uzi machine pistol, three Colt .45 pistols, one revolver, a pair of handcuffs and 173 bullets of different calibres in Lahad Datu following a tip-off from local villagers when the team was conducting an operation in the area. The weapons were believed to have been buried by surviving militants before they fled across the sea back to the Philippines.

Honours

On 11 August 2017, the Malaysian Armed Forces (MAF) held the 'Daulat Feb 2013' Battle Honour parade and award presentation ceremony at the Merdeka Square, Kota Kinabalu to honour the soldiers who died in the line of duty during the operation against the intrusion. The award was bestowed on 24 teams involved in the operation for their sincerity, efficiency and perseverance when facing tough challenges. Defence Minister Hishammuddin Hussein presented the 'Pingat Kedaulatan Negara' (PKN) to 61 MAF officers and personnel who were directly involved in the operation.

Reactions
Related parties
  – Prime Minister Najib Razak said the longer Kirams III's followers stay in Sabah, the more dangerous the situation would be for them. He added that the group "must realise that what they are doing is a serious offence" and hoped that "they will accept the offer to leave peacefully as soon as possible." He also assured the people of Sabah that their safety and the sovereignty of the state would be protected. Najib attended the signing of the Framework Agreement on the Bangsamoro in Manila in 2012. Malaysia has facilitated the peace talks between the Philippine government and the Moro Islamic Liberation Front since 2001.
  – Foreign Affairs Secretary Albert del Rosario sought the assurance of Malaysian authorities that the rights of Filipinos who were "permanent residents in Sabah and who may be among the group" would be respected. He also urged the Filipinos to "return to their homes and families." It was also clarified that the Filipino group's actions were not sanctioned by the Philippine government. The Philippine government later expressed their support for Malaysia's sovereignty of the territory, partially due to many Filipinos in Malaysia being affected by the conflict and fearing the strain that the standoff would create on economic relations with Malaysia.

Supranational bodies
  – UN Secretary-General Ban Ki-moon called for an end to the conflict in Sabah. He also urged all sides to engage in dialogue to resolve the situation peacefully. On 8 March 2013, Ban met with Hussein Haniff, the Malaysian Permanent Representative to the United Nations, to discuss recent developments to the conflict in Sabah. A statement from UN Secretariat said that the Secretary-General "reiterated his hope that the situation will be resolved as soon as possible and that efforts will continue to be made to ensure that human rights will be respected and loss of life will be prevented." It added that Ban also noted the efforts that were made by the governments of Malaysia and the Philippines to find a peaceful resolution to the situation.

States
  – The Major General of Royal Brunei Armed Forces Aminuddin Ihsan conveyed his hope that the Sabah crisis would be resolved peacefully.
  – President Susilo Bambang Yudhoyono on his statement has urged a diplomatic solution to the crisis. He said "I will pursue a diplomatic approach in the near future, because it's bad (if the incident prolongs). (But) it does not mean that Indonesia will intervene in Malaysia's internal affairs. No." Yudhoyono expressed his concern about the conflict that claimed a number of lives and hoped that the two parties could find a peaceful solution.
  – US Ambassador to the Philippines Harry K. Thomas, Jr. said that Manila and Kuala Lumpur have the ability "to work this out in a peaceful manner, according to international norms." He also added that if the two governments would sit down and talk, the standoff could be resolved without bloodshed. The United States welcomed the signing of the Framework Agreement on the Bangsamoro.

Non-state actors
 Other claimants to the Sultanate of Sulu:
  Muedzul Lail Tan Kiram decried the actions of his relatives and what he claims are "false pretenders to the throne" in a press release and on a KiniTV interview by Sumisha Naidu.
 Fuad Kiram expressed his disapproval of the actions of his first cousin, Jamalul Kiram III. He said he wants the retaking of Sabah done "by peaceful means and by peaceful coexistence with others." He also offered his prayers for the safety of the people who are in Lahad Datu.
 Abdul Rajak Aliuddin opposes the claims of Jamalul Kiram III and his supporters, stating that his own family "is the rightful owner of the throne." He claims to be the sixth Sultan of North Borneo.
 Mohd Akjan Ali Muhammad has called all the Suluk people in Sabah not to take part in the conflict. He stressed that "he is the one of the rightful heir to the Sulu Sultanate and remind all the Suluks community that they are a Malaysian citizens and has no link with the intruders from the Philippines."
 The International Union of Socialist Youth (IUSY) in its 2013 World Council called for a consultative process to resolve the conflict, and supported the right of Sabahans to self-determination.
  Moro Islamic Liberation Front – Its chairman, Murad Ibrahim, asserted that MILF is not involved with the conflict. Distancing his group, he mentioned that the issue was a matter to be resolved by the Kuala Lumpur and Manila administration. Murad also urged the Moro refugees and immigrants in Sabah to return to their homes in the Philippines.
  Moro National Liberation Front:
 (Muslimin Sema's faction) – The MNLF under Muslimin Sema condemned the incursions of the Sulu militants in Sabah. "We (MNLF) do not support with what is happening in Sabah (the intrusion and the violent acts of the terrorists). We dissaprove it. The incidents in Sabah are done to drive a wedge between our peoples." Sema said. "The incidents are also to break the bond between Sabah and the southern Philippines, as well as between Malaysia and Philippines. They want to destroy the bond (between the two peoples)", he added.
 (Nur Misuari faction) – The MNLF under Nur Misuari, an ally of Sultan Jamalul Kiram III, expressed their support of the Sulu Sultanate's claim on Sabah.

Known casualties

List of killed in action (KIA)

Police

Army

See also
 Anti-Filipino sentiment#Sabah
 History of Sabah

Further reading
 A year after: Lahad Datu intrusion revisited (Storify link) The Star
 Section: "Suluk" Invasion of Eastern Sabah Institute of Southeast Asian Studies
 The Royal Army of Sulu Invades Malaysia Center for Strategic and International Studies

References

Notes

Wars involving Malaysia
2013 in international relations
2013 in Malaysia
2013 in the Philippines
Conflicts in 2013
2013 murders in Malaysia
Diplomatic incidents
History of Sabah
Malaysia–Philippines relations
Terrorist incidents in Asia in 2013
Military operations involving Malaysia
Operations involving Malaysian special forces
Politics of Sabah
Terrorist incidents in Malaysia
Malaysian police officers killed in the line of duty
February 2013 events in Asia
March 2013 events in Asia
Terrorist incidents in Malaysia in 2013
Benigno Aquino III administration controversies